Job Castillo Galindo (born 1 November 1992) is a Mexican badminton player. He competed at the 2010 Summer Youth Olympics in Singapore. He was the bronze medalist at the 2015 Pan American Games in the men's doubles event with his partner Lino Muñoz.

Career 
Castillo started to playing badminton at the aged of seven, influenced by his sister who is a badminton coach. He affiliate with Code Jalisco team, and has won five National Championships title.

Achievements

Pan American Games 
Men's doubles

Pan Am Championships 
Men's singles

Men's doubles

Central American and Caribbean Games 
Men's doubles

Mixed doubles

BWF International Challenge/Series (15 titles, 14 runners-up) 
Men's singles

Men's doubles

Mixed doubles

  BWF International Challenge tournament
  BWF International Series tournament
  BWF Future Series tournament

References

External links 
 

1992 births
Living people
Sportspeople from Guadalajara, Jalisco
Mexican male badminton players
Badminton players at the 2010 Summer Youth Olympics
Badminton players at the 2011 Pan American Games
Badminton players at the 2015 Pan American Games
Pan American Games bronze medalists for Mexico
Pan American Games medalists in badminton
Medalists at the 2015 Pan American Games
Competitors at the 2010 Central American and Caribbean Games
Competitors at the 2014 Central American and Caribbean Games
Competitors at the 2018 Central American and Caribbean Games
Central American and Caribbean Games gold medalists for Mexico
Central American and Caribbean Games silver medalists for Mexico
Central American and Caribbean Games bronze medalists for Mexico
Central American and Caribbean Games medalists in badminton
20th-century Mexican people
21st-century Mexican people